Delaware elected its member October 3, 1826.

See also 
 1826 and 1827 United States House of Representatives elections
 List of United States representatives from Delaware

1826
Delaware
United States House of Representatives